Sheryl van Nunen OAM MBBS FRACP, is an Australian allergy researcher and Senior Staff Specialist in the Department of Clinical Immunology and Allergy at Royal North Shore Hospital in Sydney, Australia, and Clinical Associate Professor at the Sydney Medical School - Northern, University of Sydney.

Van Nunen, a specialist in allergies, is widely recognized for her work in 2007 identifying tick-induced mammalian meat allergy, which has increased in prevalence worldwide since then. In 2007 she was the first immunologist in the world to describe in a published paper the link between ticks and meat allergy. According to van Nunen, Australia has the highest rate of mammalian meat allergy and tick anaphylaxis in the world.

In 2018, after four years in development, van Nunen, in collaboration with a pharmaceuticals company and northern Sydney hospital Emergency Department, released a world-first freeze spray designed to be topically applied to ticks that have attached to humans. The spray kills ticks by freezing, rather than by the traditional method of removal using tweezers. Removing ticks by tweezers was found to have a significantly detrimental effect because tweezers squeeze toxins from the tick into the host and thereby significantly increase the allergen injected. A study released last year by van Nunen supports the growing consensus in Australia to kill the tick in situ rather than pull the tick out.

In August 2020 van Nunen urged sufferers of hay fever to get tested for COVID-19.

In 2021 van Nunen was awarded the Order of Australia Medal for service to medicine, particularly to clinical immunology and allergy.

References

Year of birth missing (living people)
Living people
Australian immunologists